The Anjajavy's Protected Area is located on a peninsula of the town of Antonibe, in the  district of Analalava and in the north-west region of Madagascar. It is part of the Sofia region of the independent province of Mahajanga and its position is between 47°13’ at 44°22’ of longitude east and 14°58 at 15°07’ of latitude south..
It can be accessed by an unpaved provincial road from Antonibe and Anjiamangirana I (RN 6).

Anjajavy's Protected Area is an element of the Madagascar dry deciduous forests situated on the Indian Ocean of northwest Madagascar.  The Anjajavy Forest surrounds the village of Anjajavy and provides a habitat for many rare and endangered species. It covers roughly fifty square kilometres, and occupies a continuous portion of the peninsula upon which Anjajavy village lies. The peninsula is bounded by Majajamba Bay to the south and Narinda Bay to the north.  Anjajavy Forest has much in common with other dry deciduous forests rising out of the tsingy limestone formations of western Madagascar.  It is due to the presence of expansive tsingy outcrops as well as the remoteness of this part of Madagascar from the population center of the country at Antananarivo that the forest here has been less disturbed than many other forests in the country.  For example, the central highland plateau, readily accessible from the population center,  has been decimated by decades of slash-and-burn farming by indigenous peoples, leading to massive desertification and erosion.  The incidence of species endemism in the western dry forests is very high, including ten of the fourteen known lemur genera, five of the eight tenrec genera and 16 of the 17 Chiroptera genera of Madagascar represented.  There are a variety of mammals, birds, reptiles and arthropods present within the Anjajavy Forest.
				
Like most of Madagascar's dry deciduous forests, the upper canopy is composed of trees which shed their leaves in the winter months (May through September), including at least two species of baobabs endemic to the western part of the island.  Trees here have adapted to the warm arid climate by shedding leaves in the dry season to reduce evapotranspiration, and some species such as the baobab store large amounts of water in their bulbous trunks.

There is a very high rate of species endemicity in all the western dry deciduous forests of Madagascar, for both flora and fauna; this rate is thought to be higher than for the eastern rainforests, although the biodiversity, while extremely high, is slightly less than the eastern counterparts.  Geologically the tsingy formations have numerous caverns (used by early tribesmen) and karst formations, which provide underground water storage.

Flora & Natural Habitats
A critically endangered habitat, Anjajavy's Protected Area is a rare and precious dry deciduous forest. 

Madagascar is a botanical paradise, with more than 13,000 indigenous species including 900 orchid varieties, 200 palm tree species and 130 species of aloes. The island is so large and has such a diversity of habitats and climates that each corner of Madagascar has its own special community of plants. The forest canopy contains numerous species of deciduous trees, including at least two species of baobab, Adansonia rubrostipa and Adansonia madagascariensis.  In addition, trees such as Grewia ciclea (Malagasy name, andilambarika) and Terminalia catappa (Malagasy name: antafana) occur.  The latter tree provides a favourite food supply to the Coquerel's lemur, with both fruits and leaves being appealing. Anjajavy finds itself amongst the community of the dry deciduous forests of the North-West; an eco-region recognised by the major international organisations of nature conservation as a global critical priority for conservation. For naturalists and amateurs of plants, there is a lot to see: aloes, euphorbias, bottle-creepers, giant vanilla beans growing on the sharp limestone formations of the Tsingy. The endemic ebony and rosewood trees are also plentiful. Much of the flora in the Protected Area has not been identified. New species are regularly being discovered in particular from December to April throughout the rainy season. Some of the common shrubs found in the Anjajavy forest are Vepris ampody (Malagasy name: ampoly) and Rhizorphora mucronata (Malagasy name: honkovavy).  There are also abundant lianas (vines) as well as numerous herbs, including the Madagascar vanilla (Vanilla madagascariensis, whose Malagasy name is vahimatso).

The dry forest verges on mangrove swamps in the vicinity of several coastal estuaries at the western verge of the Anjajavy Forest, where small streams discharge into the Indian Ocean.

The Anjajavy's Protected Area and its surroundings include a geological phenomena of rare beauty: the Tsingy. This karstic and highly rugged landscape is the dramatic expression of an evolutionary stage of the earth, taking the shape of a “stone forest”, with limestone towers and spurs as high as 30 meters, all within the forest and in the middle of the sea. Nature has adapted itself to these labyrinths for millions of years and has formed unique natural shows of caves, grottos, highland areas, gorges and walls of rugged rocks. Due to their inaccessibility and their resistance to fire, the Tsingy has provided protection for numerous parts of the primary forest. 

The baobab tree is an emblem of Madagascar. The large island is home to seven species of baobabs, of which six are endemic. In Anjajavy, there is three species of baobabs: the Grey (Adansonia madagascariensis), the African (Adansonia digitata) and the Fony Baobab (Adansonia rubrostipa). The latter, endemic to the eco-region is red and gold in color with patterns looking as if they were hand-painted. The baobab trees clinging to the Tsingy islands in the turquoise waters of Moramba Bay shape one of Madagascar’s most spectacular and magical landscapes. These swollen giants have many outstanding qualities. They are the longest living flowering plants on earth - with some living up to 2,000 years. These trees are true survivors, withstanding terrible droughts and fierce storms, and they can grow on bare rock on sea isles. They can even live and grow wrapped around each other, as if in love. Every baobab has its own shape, its own character, its own story. It is therefore not surprising that these incredible trees are revered by the local people, and that some of them are held as sacred. People make offerings at the base of the baobab, such as zebu horns, coins, rum or honey in the hope of receiving protection from the ancestors.

The Moramba Bay, the malagasy Halong Bay, is a diverse karstic land formation where Anjajavy meets the Mozambique Channel. Along the coast, the jagged cliffs of many marine Tsingy rise close to 30m out of the water. 

The Anjajavy Protected Area is protected to the north and west by three wide, separate mangroves and their winding tidal channels. These wetland ecosystems are an example of the vital service nature provides to human beings on a global scale. The mangrove rivers flanking the Anjajavy Forest form excellent natural borders to the Protected Area and convenient transportation routes to visit. The mangroves of Anjajavy comprise a great number of species of trees and shrubs adapted to salty water. One of them, the Jajavy (Salvador angustifolia) has given its name to the village. The root entanglement forming stilts or buttresses, the thick mud and the daily tidal action forms an excellent haven, nursery and larder for terrestrial and aquatic fauna. Hundreds of species of fish, shellfish, insects and birds depend on this habitat for food and shelter. In Anjajavy, the mangrove swamps protect the natural Reserve of dry deciduous forest as well as the Marine Reserve. This biotope simultaneously serves as a curtain of protection against strong and salty winds, a fire-wall, a damp buffer useful to the forest during the dry season and as filter against the turbidity of the coastal waters. The two rivers of mangroves on both sides of the Anjajavy forest constitute excellent natural borders for the Protected Area as well as practical transportation routes which allow for better exploration. In general, the mangroves also provide human beings with vital services; the pneumatophore roots help to stabilise the soft soils and to protect the coast line against erosion and natural catastrophes. On a global scale, these habitats capture carbon in their sediments, where it can remain for centuries. The mangroves are therefore one of the most efficient natural carbon sinks in the world, with rates or carbon sequestration up to 50 times greater than those of tropical forests. The phytoplankton and plankton of the mud constitute the point of origin of food supply chains which provide to the precious fish needed for the second economic source of Anjajavy: the traditional fishing industry.

Fauna & Exceptional Biodiversity

The inventories and observations of the animal and plant species of Anjajavy are testimony to its great biological wealth, with no fewer than five critically endangered species, 15 in danger of extinction and 13 vulnerable to extinction. The large majority of these species are endemic to Madagascar or to the nearby region.

Lemurs 
The lemurs are easy to observe in their natural environment. Lemurs are a noted species in the Anjajavy Forest, since they are abundant in the trees and even sometimes on the forest floor . The most frequently seen diurnal species are Coquerel's sifaka and the common brown lemur both of which are completely wild but show no fear of humans gardens. Other, nocturnal lemurs of the Anjajavy Forest include three species of mouse lemur (Microcebus spp.), one species of sportive lemur (Lepilemur sp.) and the fat-tailed dwarf lemur (Cheirogaleus medius). Since none of these nocturnal lemur populations have been researched by specialists, it is possible that some may represent new, undescribed species.

Lemurs of the Anjajavy Forest are: 
 Milne Edward sportive lemur 	(Lepilemur edwardsi)
 Coquerel's sifaka	(Propithecus coquereli)
 Fat-tailed dwarf lemur	(Cheirogaleus medius)
 Golden brown mouse lemur	(Microcebus ravelobensis)
 Danfoss mouse lemur	(Microcebus danfossi)
 Gray mouse lemur	(Microcebus murinus)
 Common brown lemur	(Eulemur fulvus)
Aye-Aye 	(Daubentonia madagascariensis)

Bats 
The tsingy caves provide special habitat for the bats of this region, offering cool shelter.  Probably the most common member of the chiroptera family locally is the Commerson's leaf-nosed bat (Hipposideros commersoni).  The cave explorers will also sight Tiavato bats (Paremballonura tiavato) in flight and some hanging from the ceiling on stalactite formations of the limestone cave interiors. A cruise on the mangrove before sunset often shows skies with many Madagascar flying foxes (Pteropus rufus).

Fossa 
Also seen in the Anjajavy Forest area is the endangered Fossa (Cryptoprocta ferox), the largest mammalian carnivore is endemic to the island. Even though it looks similar to a puma, it is actually more closely related to the mongoose and civet. Very comfortable in trees, its long tail helps the animal to balance itself on the branches and its very flexible legs allow it to go down tree trunks head down. The main predator of the lemurs, this mammal is essential to the health of the lemur population as it kills the sick or weakest. Its territory is between 1,300 and 2,600 hectares in size. The Fossa is vulnerable to extinction. As a chicken and cattle hunter, it is seldom welcome around homes.

Birds

There is abundandant birdlife present in the Anjajavy Forest, a paradise for birds and bird watchers. Inventories have documented the presence in the Protected Area of more than 134 different bird species. One of the most emblematic is the Madagascar fish eagle, which has four breeding pairs in the Anjajavy Forest according to Garbutt and Hogan.  This very large bird of prey is endemic to western Madagascar, and the species is critically endangered. 

The Malagasy Fish Eagle (Haliaeetus vociferoides) called «Ankoay» in Malagasy, is a large bird of prey endemic to the coastal strip North-West of Madagascar. Various estimations place the number of remaining breeding pairs to be between 40 and 150. This bird may therefore be one of the rarest on Earth. We must act fast in order to protect the three to six pairs between Anjajavy's Protected Area and Moramba Bay.

According to Anjajavy le Lodge continuous nature inventory bird species frequenting the Anjajavy Forest are:

Reptiles & Amphibians

Anjajavy is home to an amazing diversity of lizards and other reptiles: the tropical climate and regular sunshine provide the perfect environment for about 40 species. Each tree seems to accommodate a gold-flecked gecko or a chameleon. After the dry season from May to October it is easy to see an assortment of chameleons, lizards and snakes in the Anjajavy Forest.

Among the snakes (that are not dangerous) are :
 Madagascar ground boa (Acrantophis madagascariensis) that can swallow a lemur in half an hour
 Madagascar hog-nosed snake (Leioheterodon madagascariensis)=
 Madagascar tree boa (Sanzinia madagascariensis)	
 Cat eye snake (Madagascarophis colubrinus)	
 Red eye snake (Stenophis variabilis)	
 White hognose snake (Leioheterodon modestus)	
 Leaf nose snake  (Langaha madagascariensis)	
 Zebra snake (Langaha alluaudi)	
 Sword tailed snake (Ithycyphus perineti)	
 (Liophidium torquatum)	
 Whip snake (Dromicodryas bernieri)	
 (Dromicodryas quadrilineatus)	
 Pencil snake  (Mimophis mahfalensis)	
 (Heteroliodon accipitalis)	
 (Heteroliodon fohy)	

Chameleon species present include: 
 Giant chameleon (Furcifer oustaleti)
 Panther chameleon (Furcifer pardalis)	
 Long nose chameleon (Furcifer angeli)	
 Pygmy caméleon (Brookesia ambreensis) 
 Plated leaf chameleon (Brookesia stumpffi)

Madagascan Big-Headed Turtle 
This species of freshwater turtle (Erymnochelys madagascariensis) enjoys the lakes and streams of the Malagasy North-West coast. Its habitat is in great danger of destruction in favor of rice cultivation. The species is also threatened by collecting for the markets of traditional Asian pharmacopeia. It is the focus of numerous conservation programmes. Anjajavy le Lodge is pursuing a project of conservation of this turtle through monitoring of reproduction sites and through community awareness-raising campaigns.

See also
Madagascar dry deciduous forests
Karst topography

References

Geography of Madagascar
Forests of Madagascar
Madagascar dry deciduous forests
Protected areas in Diana Region